"Then the Morning Comes" is a song by American band Smash Mouth. It was released in September 1999 as the second single from the band's second studio album, Astro Lounge. The song was a successful follow-up to the international hit "All Star" in several nations, peaking at number 11 on the US Billboard Hot 100, number two in Canada, number 17 in Iceland and number 22 in New Zealand.

Composition
"Then the Morning Comes" is written with the verses and pre-choruses in C minor, the chorus in E♭ major, and the bridge in C major. The song runs at 116 beats per minute. Like most Smash Mouth songs, the music is played a semitone flat.

Music video
The music video was filmed in Santa Cruz, California and was directed by Scott Marshall. In the video, vocalist Steve Harwell keeps having nightmares about seeing a beautiful woman (Stacy Sanches), waking when something embarrassing happens (first a dog urinates on him and the next time he steps in gum) and the woman laughs at him. However, in the last version (in which he is still wearing pyjama pants and slippers), she joins him and he awakens to reveal the two in bed together.

Charts

Weekly charts

Year-end charts

Release history

References

1999 singles
1999 songs
Interscope Records singles
Smash Mouth songs
Song recordings produced by Eric Valentine
Songs written by Greg Camp
Songs written by Paul Barry (songwriter)